Albert of Prussia or Albert of Hohenzollern (in German, Albrecht von Hohenzollern) may refer to:

 Albert of Mainz (1490–1545), also known as Albert of Brandenburg, archbishop
 Albert, Duke of Prussia (1490–1568)
 Albert Frederick, Duke of Prussia (1553–1618)
 Prince Albert of Prussia (1809–1872), the fifth son and youngest child of King Frederick William III of Prussia and Louise of Mecklenburg-Strelitz
 Prince Albert of Prussia (1837–1906), son of the above
 Prince Albert of Prussia (b. 1998), son of Prince Oskar of Prussia